A Hero's Welcome: Pieces for Rare Occasions is a live album by multi-instrumentalist Alan Silva and bassist William Parker. It was recorded in March 1998 at Context Studios in New York City, and was released in 1999 by Eremite Records.

Reception

In a review for AllMusic, Steve Loewy wrote: "You might not expect such lushness from a duo of midi keyboard and acoustic string bass... but... this is music of considerable substance... Silva... has much to say. His artistry on midi is that of a painter using broad sweeps of the brush. Parker solidly complements the sounds, sometimes laying a floor and at others doing what he does best: surprising with leaps, grunts, and stretched strings, and extending the natural limits of his ax."

The authors of the Penguin Guide to Jazz Recordings awarded the album 3½ stars, callling it "a project of awesome power," and stating: "Silva... create[s] a body of sound that occupies a mid-territory between Duke Ellington or Charles Mingus and Edgard Varèse... Parker is... beyond reproach and beyond categorization."

Writing for All About Jazz, Michael McCaw described the album as "a beautifully detailed recording," and commented: "it feels as if this music was a pre-composed suite with the musicians allowed some latitude throughout... this is a landmark album... anyone interested in the prowess and abilities of William Parker as a bassist would be wise to seek it out."

Track listing
Composed by Alan Silva and William Parker.

 "I" – 8:25
 "II" – 7:26
 "III" – 6:50
 "IV" – 9:24
 "V" – 13:44

Personnel
 Alan Silva – keyboards, piano
 William Parker – bass

References

1999 live albums
Alan Silva live albums
William Parker (musician) live albums
Live free jazz albums
Eremite Records live albums